Andrés Gómez and John McEnroe were the defending champions. They reached the final where they were defeated by Guy Forget and Henri Leconte

Draw

Final

Group A
Standings are determined by: 1. number of wins; 2. number of matches; 3. in three-players-ties, percentage of sets won, or of games won; 4. steering-committee decision.

Group B
Standings are determined by: 1. number of wins; 2. number of matches; 3. in three-players-ties, percentage of sets won, or of games won; 4. steering-committee decision.

References
Completed matches (Legends Over 45 Doubles), accessed 2011-06-05.

Legends Over 45 Doubles